Le Passage is a commune in the Lot-et-Garonne department in south-western France. It is part of the agglomeration of Agen.

The Agen - La Garenne Aerodrome is located in Le Passage.

Population

Twin towns
Le Passage is twinned with:

  Consuegra, Spain
  Włoszczowa, Poland

See also

Communes of the Lot-et-Garonne department

References

Passage
Lot-et-Garonne communes articles needing translation from French Wikipedia